Janina Elkin (born 20 December 1982 in Kyiv, Ukrainian Soviet Republic) is a German film and theater actress.

Background 
Janina Elkin was born on 20 December 1982 in Kyiv, Ukrainian SSR. She attended the State Dance Academy in Kiev. At the age of 10, she moved with her family to Heidelberg, Germany. She attended the State Ballet Academy in Mannheim, where she trained as a ballet dancer. With a scholarship, she studied acting at the Lee Strasberg Theatre and Film Institute in New York City from 2001 to 2004. Since 2004 she has been working as an actress on stage as well as in film and television. From 2009 to 2010 she played the role of Baby in the musical Dirty Dancing in Berlin. 
Elkin played her first major leading role in the feature film Bela Kiss: Prologue, released in Germany in January 2013.She became internationally known with her role in the Netflix miniseries The Queen's Gambit.

Filmography 
 2003: Küssen verboten, Baggern erlaubt
 2004: Tumbling Leaf – Ein Tag im Herbst
 2005: Frauenhelden – Machos in der Sackgasse
 2005: Stubbe – Von Fall zu Fall: Harte Kerle
 2005: Lorenz
 2005: Schmetterlingseffekt
 2006: 
 2006: Das Duo: Unter Strom
 2009: SOKO 5113: Tote kuscheln nicht
 2009: Scissu
 2010: Wie Blumen
 2010: Not Afraid
 2010: 1000 Gramm
 2011: Schloss Einstein
 2012: Stille Nacht
 2012: Die Welt nebenan
 2012: Lady Europa
 2013: Bela Kiss: Prologue
 2013: In aller Freundschaft: Zeit für Veränderungen
 2013: Der Landarzt: Erstickungsangst
 2013: 
 2014: Vivre à Berlin
 2014: Contese
 2015: Fremdkörper
 2015: Frühling zu zweit
 2015: Noah
 2015: SOKO Stuttgart: Masken
 2015: Service
 2016: Ente Gut! Mädchen allein zu Haus
 2016: Tod auf Raten (Short Term Memory Loss)
 2016: Ostfriesisch für Anfänger
 2016: SOKO Leipzig: Tod eines Kollegen
 2016–2018: Schloß Webstein
 2017: Notruf Hafenkante: Abnabelung
 2017: Vollmond
 2017: Die andere Welt
 2018: Der Besuch
 2019: In aller Freundschaft – Die jungen Ärzte: Schwindel
 2019: Matula – Tod auf Mallorca
 2019: Darkroom – Tödliche Tropfen
 2019: Tatort: Die harte Kern
 2019: Lovers
 2020: The Queen's Gambit
 2021: Tatort: Was wir erben
 2021: WaPo Lake Constance

References 

1998 births
German actresses
German film actresses
20th-century German actresses
Living people